Nashwaak Village is a settlement located in York County in New Brunswick on the Nashwaak River.

History

Notable people

See also 
List of communities in New Brunswick

References 

Communities in York County, New Brunswick